Prime Cuts is a compilation album by Jordan Rudess released in 2006.

It features performances by Robert Berry, Marc Bonilla, Terry Bozzio, Jerry Goodman, Tony Levin, Rod Morgenstein, John Petrucci, Simon Phillips, Mike Portnoy, Kip Winger, and Mark Wood. It contains two previously unreleased duets with Jordan and Kip Winger.

Track listing
 "Universal Mind" - 7:50 (Liquid Tension Experiment)
 "Tear Before the Rain" - 6:33 (Jordan Rudess (previously unreleased mix))
 "Revolutionary Etude" - 2:37 (Frédéric Chopin)
 "Osmosis" - 4:21 (Vapourspace Remix of Liquid Tension Experiment)
 "Faceless Pastiche" - 4:27 (Rod Morgenstein and Jordan Rudess)
 "Outcast" - 4:22 (Jordan Rudess)
 "Liquid Dreams" - 10:48 (Liquid Tension Experiment)
 "Hoedown" - 3:46 (Various Artists ELP Tribute)
 "Beyond Tomorrow" - 9:54 (Jordan Rudess (previously unreleased mix))
 "Feed the Wheel" - 7:14 (Jordan Rudess)

External links
Prime Cuts at Magna Carta

2006 compilation albums